Tamal or Tomol in Iran may refer to:
 Tamal, Gilan
 Tamal, Kermanshah
 Tomol, Mazandaran